Brandon is a census-designated place (CDP) in and governed by Kiowa County, Colorado, United States. The population of the Brandon CDP was 21 at the United States Census 2010. The Sheridan Lake post office (Zip Code 81071) serves Brandon postal addresses.

History
The town of Brandon was established in late 1887. The Brandon post office opened on May 19, 1888, and closed on February 28, 1963.

Geography
Brandon is located in eastern Kiowa County. Colorado State Highway 96 passes along the north side of the community, leading west  to Eads, the county seat, and east  to Sheridan Lake.

Demographics

See also

 List of census-designated places in Colorado

References

External links

 Brandon @ GhostTowns.com
 Sand Creek Massacre National Historic Site
 Kiowa County website

Census-designated places in Kiowa County, Colorado
Census-designated places in Colorado